Labeobarbus alluaudi is a species of ray-finned fish in the  family Cyprinidae. It has been found only in three rivers in Uganda. Some taxonomic authorities consider tis species to be a hybrid of Labeobarbus somereni and Labeobarbus ruwenzorii.

References

alluaudi
Taxa named by Jacques Pellegrin
Fish described in 1909
Taxonomy articles created by Polbot
Taxobox binomials not recognized by IUCN